Oakwood (formerly Mount Pleasant and Mexico) is an unincorporated community, in Cecil County, Maryland, United States.

References

Unincorporated communities in Maryland
Unincorporated communities in Cecil County, Maryland